Cynaeda escherichi is a moth in the family Crambidae. It was described by O. Hofmann in 1897. It is found in Turkey.

References

Moths described in 1897
Odontiini